Konovalova is a rural locality (a village) in Krasnovishersky District, Perm Krai, Russia. The population was 2 as of 2010.

Geography 
Konovalova is located 69 km southeast of Krasnovishersk (the district's administrative centre) by road. Krasny Bereg is the nearest rural locality.

References 

Rural localities in Krasnovishersky District